Ramón Vega Hidalgo (February 1, 1934 – May 7, 2014) was a Chilean politician and military personal. He was commander in chief of the Chilean Air Force from 1991 to 1995. In 1998 he was appointed institutional senator, a position he held starting in 1998. He left office in 2006.

Hidalgo was born in Santiago, Chile. He died from heart failure in Santiago, Chile, aged 80.

References

1934 births
2014 deaths
Chilean politicians
People from Santiago